Juma River is a tributary of the Aripuanã River in Amazonas state in north-western Brazil.

See also
List of rivers of Amazonas

External links
Brazilian Ministry of Transport

Rivers of Amazonas (Brazilian state)